In Buddhism, the abbot is the head of a Buddhist monastery or large Buddhist temple. In Buddhist nunneries, the nun who holds the equivalent position is known as the abbess.

In English-speaking countries, the English word "abbot" is used instead of all the various words that exist in the languages of the countries where Buddhism is, or was historically, well established.

Role 
An abbot is a monk who holds the position of administrator of a monastery or large temple. The administrative duties of an abbot or abbess include overseeing the day-to-day running of the monastery. The abbot or abbess also holds spiritual responsibility for the monastics under their care, and is required to interact with the abbots or abbesses of other monasteries.

Languages other than English 
Asian countries where Buddhism is still widely practiced have words in their own languages for the abbot of a Buddhist monastery or large temple:

Chinese 
In Chinese Chan Buddhist monasteries, a common word for abbot is Fāngzhàng (方丈) meaning "one square zhàng (equal to ten square feet)", a reference to the size of Vimalakirti's stone room. 

Another word for abbot is Zhùchí (住持), meaning "dweller" and "upholder." Monks and nuns tend to be addressed as Fǎshī (法師) meaning "Dharma teacher."

Japanese 

In Japanese Buddhism, the most commonly used words for the abbot of a large temple or monastery are jūji (住持), jūjishoku (住持職), or simply jūshoku (住職). Occasionally the word jishu (寺主) is used as well, derived from the Sanskrit word vihārasvāmin which referred to the supervisor of a vihāra that contained a stupa.

A temple without a priest is denoted by the term mujū (無住).

Sectarian differences
The following table contains a non-exhaustive list of titles used among the many schools within Japanese Buddhism.

As shown above, the term 和尚 (Oshō, etc.) can be pronounced several ways, depending on the tradition in question. Its origins are in the Sanskrit word upādhyāya originally referring to someone who conferred the precepts onto another. 

Hōin (法印) was originally a title bestowed upon a monk by the emperor. Shōnin (上人) is a title of respect to one who has attained a certain level of enlightenment. Goin (御院) and Inke (院家) refer to the temple proper.

In the case of Pure Land Buddhism, which de-emphasizes discipline in favor of household life, the words for abbacy tend to be a reflection of the institution rather than the person in charge. In the Kansai region, Goingesan (ご院家さん), Goinsan (御院さん) and Goensan (ご縁さん) are commonly used among Shin Buddhists. Abbacy also tends to be inherited from family lineage within Pure Land traditions.

Hōushu or Hossu (法主) is the title used by Ekan Ikeguchi at Saifuku-ji in Kagoshima. It is also used among the Seven Head Temples of Jōdo-shū and Taiseki-ji of Nichiren Shōshū.

In the Tendai tradition, the term Zasu 座主 is common. The abbot is also sometimes referred to as Yama no zasu (山の座主), meaning "Abbot of the mountain."

Monzeki (門跡) was a term reserved for priests of aristocratic or imperial lineage, and is still used today at Daikaku-ji of Shingon and Hongan-ji of Jōdo Shinshū.

Korean 
The Korean word for abbot is juji(住持/주지).

Tibetan 
The abbot of a Tibetan Buddhist monastery is known as the Khenpo. This means "the one who gives the monks vows". The abbot is both addressed as and referred to as "Khen Rinpoche". 

Another word used for more senior abbots is Khenchen, which means "senior khenpo."

References 

Buddhist titles